Milan Vidmar is a Yugoslav retired slalom canoeist who competed in the 1960s. He won a silver medal in the C-2 team event at the 1965 ICF Canoe Slalom World Championships in Spittal.

References

External links 
 Milan VIDMAR at CanoeSlalom.net

Yugoslav male canoeists
Possibly living people
Year of birth missing
Medalists at the ICF Canoe Slalom World Championships